Theunis Theodorus Cloete (31 May 1924 – 9 July 2015) was a renowned Afrikaans poet, Bible translator, essayist and academic. In the 1970s he was involved in the revision of the ''Afrikaanse Kerkgesange'' and later in the 1993 translation of the Bible. Cloete was linked to The University of Potchefstroom's (now North-West University) School of Language and Literature. He has won numerous literary awards, including the Ingrid Jonker Prize, W.A. Hofmeyr Prize, Hertzog Prize (twice) and the Andrew Murray Prize. Cloete mostly wrote under the penname T. Jansen van Rensburg (his grandfather's name) and published numerous of his poems in magazines under the penname to test the water before his 1980 debut Angelliera.

Publications

Poetry 
 1980 Angelliera
 1982 Jukstaposisie
 1985 Allotroop
 1986 Idiolek
 1989 Driepas
 1992 Met die aarde praat
 1998 Uit die hoek van my oog
 2001 Die baie ryk ure: 100 uitgesoekte gedigte
 2007 Heilige nuuskierigheid
 2010 Uit die wit lig van my land gesny. Vir Anna
 2011 Onversadig
 2014 Karnaval en Lent

Short stories 
 1984 Die waarheid gelieg
 1997 Identikit

Plays 
 1986 Onderhoud met ’n bobbejaan

Academic publications 
 1953 Trekkerswee en Joernaal van Jorik : twee gedigte met historiese materiaal uit twee fases van die Afrikaanse letterkunde
 1957 Beskouings oor poësie: ’n bundel opgedra aan prof. G. Dekker op sy sestigste verjaardag 11 November 1957 (met andere)
 1961 Die wêreld is ons woning nie: ’n studie van die poësie van Totius met tekste
 1963 Totius
 1963 Op die woord af: opstelle oor die poësie van N.P. van Wyk Louw
 1963 Eugène N. Marais
 1966 Gids by D.J. Opperman se Senior Verseboek
 1970 Twee idilles: Martjie en Trekkerswee (Blokboek)
 1970 Tetralogie van F.A. Venter
 1970 Kaneel: Opstelle oor die letterkunde
 1972 Sensuur: prinsipieel en prakties besien
 1974 Joernaal van Jorik (Blokboek)
 1974 N.P. van Wyk Louw, 11 Junie 1906 – 18 Junie 1970
 1978 Totius se organiese beskouing  (Langenhovengedenklesing)
 1980 Die Afrikaanse literatuur sedert sestig
 1980 Van Wyk Louw se fundamenteel dramatiese instelling (NP van Wyk Louw-gedenklesing)
 1982 Die verhouding tussen die skrywer en sy volk
 1982 Hoe om ’n gedig te ontleed (Blokboek)
 1984 Wat is literatuur?
 1993 Die literatuur en sy verband met die tyd
 2004 Van Leopold Tot Achterberg

Editor and co-editor 
 Die Afrikaanse literatuur sedert sestig (together with A.P. Grové, J.P. Smuts and Elize Botha), 1980
 Gids by die literatuurstudie (together with Elize Botha and Charles Malan), 1985
 Literêre terme en teorieë (together with Hein Viljoen, Leon Strydom, Heilnadu Plooy and Anne-Marie Bosschoff), 1992

Other 
 Van Hooft tot Luyken (together with G. Dekker), 1961
 Van Hendrik van Veldeke tot Spieghel, 1963
 Vyfling, 1966
 Faune, 1966
 Poort 1972 (together with P.D. van der Walt and L. Dekker) 1973
 Totius: Vyftig gedigte, 1876
 Lens 78/79 (together with Rudolph Willemse), 1979
 Dit kom van ver af, 2002

Translations 
 Meneer Perrichon gaan op reis – E. Labiche en Ed. Martin, 1962

Awards 
 1976 Gustav Preller medal for Literature and Literary Criticism
 1980 Ingrid Jonker Prize for Poetry (Angelliera)
 1981 W.A. Hofmeyr Prize for Poetry (Angelliera)
 1983 Louis Luyt Prize (Jukstaposisie)
 1985 CNA Prize (Allotroop)
 1986 W.A. Hofmeyr Prize (Allotroop)
 1986 Honorary Doctorate from the University of Potchefstroom
 1987 Hertzog Prize for Poetry (Allotroop and Idiolek)
 1990 W.A. Hofmeyr Prize (Driepas)
 1992 Rapport Prize (Met die aarde praat)
 1993 Rapportryers Prize for Poetry (Met die aarde praat)
 1993 Hertzog Prize for Poetry (Met die aarde praat)
 2002 Andrew Murray Prize
 2002 N.P. van Wyk Louw medal
 2007 FAK-erepenning
 2008 Honorary membership of the Suid-Afrikaanse Akademie vir Wetenskap en Kuns
 2016 South African Literary Awards Posthumous Literary Award

References 

1924 births
2015 deaths
Afrikaans-language poets
Afrikaner people
20th-century South African poets
South African male poets
Hertzog Prize winners for poetry